Don't Get Scared Now is the debut extended play by American hip hop record label Griselda Records, released on May 13, 2016, by Griselda Records. The EP is produced by Daringer and The Alchemist and features a guest appearance from Prodigy.

Track listing

All tracks are produced by Daringer, except "Ajax" produced by The Alchemist

References

2016 EPs
Hip hop albums by American artists
Hip hop compilation albums
Record label compilation albums
Albums produced by the Alchemist (musician)
Albums produced by Daringer (producer)
Griselda Records EPs